William Reuben Collins (18 October 1911 – 9 September 1993) was a New Zealand rugby union player. As a lock, Collins represented Poverty Bay and Hawkes Bay at a provincial level, and was a member of the New Zealand national side, the All Blacks, from 1934 to 1936. He never played a full test for New Zealand due to injury, but was part of the 1935–36 New Zealand rugby union tour of Britain, Ireland and Canada where he played in matches against local sides.

He died aged 81 in Auckland in 1993.

References

1911 births
1993 deaths
New Zealand rugby union players